Lobotrema is a genus of monopisthocotylean monogeneans, belonging to the family Diplectanidae. All its species are parasites on fish.
The type-species is Lobotrema madrasi Tripathi, 1959.

The two genera Allomurraytrema Yamaguti, 1963 and Pseudomurraytrema Yamaguti, 1958 are considered synonyms of Lobotrema.

Species
According to the World Register of Marine Species, species include:

 Lobotrema argyrosomi (Bychowsky & Nagibina, 1977) Oliver, 1987 
 Lobotrema caballeroi Gupta & Sharma, 1984
 Lobotrema kumari Oliver, 1987 
 Lobotrema madrasi Tripathi, 1959 
 Lobotrema sciaenae (Bychowsky & Nagibina, 1977) Oliver, 1987 
 Lobotrema spari (Yamaguti, 1958) Oliver, 1987 
 Lobotrema youngi Gupta & Sharma, 1984

References

Diplectanidae
Monogenea genera
Parasites of fish